Gwendolyn Osborne-Smith (born 7 August 1978) is a model and actress who spent 12 years on The Price Is Right as a model from 2005 to 2017. Born to a Jamaican mother and British father, Osborne married retired NBA player (and current TNT basketball analyst) Kenny Smith on 2 September 2006. They have two children together (Malloy and London) and Smith is stepfather to Osborne's daughter (Monique) from a previous relationship. On 17 October 2017, it was announced that she would be leaving the show to pursue other interests.

Acting
Fresh off the set as an actor of Wonder Woman 1984, which was released in June 2020, Osborne completed an arc on General Hospital playing the fierce role of Police Chief Vic. She also plays Misandra on In the Cut on Bouncetv.  She also played Jade Dominquez in Miami for two seasons in Ocean Ave and had an appearance in Adam Sandler's Jack and Jill.

Osborne is a reality producer wrapping a full season that showcases herself and her whole family Meet the Smiths on TBS.

Working with the Global production group ITV America as a producer, Osborne was nominated for the segment "Foulshots by Kenny Smith" on TRUTV in the Cynopsis Short Form Video Festival.

Beauty
Osborne, Founder and CEO of Lomolique, started her own skincare business named Lomolique.

Music
Expanding her horizons and following her passion for music, Osborne has released her single "Give My Love".

References

External links
 

1978 births
Game show models
Living people
English people of Jamaican descent
People from Bath, Somerset